Orlando Pizzolato (born 30 July 1958) is a retired long-distance runner from Italy.

Biography
He represented his native country in the men's marathon at the 1988 Summer Olympics, finishing in 16th place (2:15:20). His biggest success was twice winning the New York City Marathon (1984 and 1985), and the silver medal in the men's marathon at the 1986 European Championships in Stuttgart, West Germany.

Achievements
All results regarding marathon, unless stated otherwise

References

 1988 Year Ranking

External links
 

1958 births
Living people
Italian male long-distance runners
Italian male marathon runners
Athletes (track and field) at the 1988 Summer Olympics
Olympic athletes of Italy
New York City Marathon male winners
European Athletics Championships medalists
Universiade medalists in athletics (track and field)
World Athletics Championships athletes for Italy
People from Thiene
Universiade gold medalists for Italy
Sportspeople from the Province of Vicenza